Jean-Clotaire Tsoumou-Madza (born 31 January 1975) is a Congolese former professional footballer who played as a defender. He spent one season in the Bundesliga with Eintracht Frankfurt and made one appearance for the Congo national team.

References

1975 births
Living people
Republic of the Congo footballers
Association football defenders
Republic of the Congo international footballers
VfL Herzlake players
SV Meppen players
FC St. Pauli players
FC Oberlausitz Neugersdorf players
Eintracht Frankfurt players
Rot Weiss Ahlen players
Bundesliga players
2. Bundesliga players
Republic of the Congo expatriate footballers
Republic of the Congo expatriate sportspeople in Germany
Expatriate footballers in Germany
Republic of the Congo expatriate sportspeople in Malaysia
Expatriate footballers in Malaysia